Guentheridia formosa, the spotted puffer, is a species of pufferfish native to the coasts of the eastern Pacific Ocean from Costa Rica to Ecuador.  This species grows to a length of  TL. It is the only known member of the monotypic genus Guentheridia.

Other common names for the fish include compère taché in French and tamborín and tamboril manchado in Spanish.

Description 
The spotted puffer has a white body with dense dark spots on its back and sides in various patterns, with variable yellowish markings. Its head is wider than it is deep, and is convex between the eyes. It as a single dorsal fin at its rear, a similar-shaped anal fin below, and in front of the pectoral fin it has a slit-like gill opening. The spotted puffer's tail fin is generally straight, and can be dusky or greenish.

Habitat 
Found in coastal shallow water at depths between 0-10 m, generally at the bottom on soft substrate such as mud or sand.

References

External Links

Tetraodontidae
Taxa named by Charles Henry Gilbert
Taxa named by Edwin Chapin Starks
Taxa named by Albert Günther